The Hard Way is the second and final studio album released by American rock musician Owsley.

It was released in 2004 on the independent Lakeview label, five years after his debut album. Some of the delay was attributed to legal difficulties with his former label, Giant Records.

Critics have described the album as having a "heavier" and "more mature" sound compared to his debut album, and note musical influences of Big Star, Todd Rundgren, Tom Petty and Paul McCartney and Wings. Critic Susanne Ault of Billboard wrote, "The music straddles indie and pop sensibilities without ever stepping one foot clearly onto one side or the other. While The Hard Way rolls along competently, the midtempo guitar hooks and straightahead vocals lack the necessary punch to reach mainstream consciousness."

The album was recorded over the span of three years, at different studios in Tennessee, as well as at his home recording studio in Anniston, Alabama. As recording formats and equipment, Owsley used a Studer 16-track 2" at 15 ips, an MCI 16-track 2" at 30 ips, the Otari Radar II multitrack hard disk recorder, and Pro Tools.

The lead single is "Be with You".

Track listing

Personnel 
 Will Owsley – lead vocals, backing vocals, electric guitars, acoustic guitar (3, 8), bass (5, 6, 8), acoustic piano (6, 7)
 Jonathan Hamby – Hammond B3 organ, acoustic piano (4), Chamberlin (5), synthesizers (9)
 Keith Thomas – strings (1, 6)
 John Mark Painter – Chamberlin (2)
 Tom Bukovac – electric guitar (1), acoustic guitar (1), bass (2)
 Gordon Kennedy – electric guitar (7), backing vocals (7)
 Jimmie Lee Sloas – bass (1, 7)
 Michael Rhodes – bass (3, 9, 10)
 Millard Powers – bass (4)
 Chris McHugh – drums, percussion
 Simon Petty – harmonica (8)
 Rebecca Walker – backing vocals (10)

Production 
 Scot McCracken – executive producer, creative director
 Will Owsley – producer, engineer 
 Keith Thomas – producer (1), photography 
 James Michael – vocal producer (8)
 Paul David Hager – engineer, mixing 
 Mark Ralston – mix assistant 
 Jeff Balding – engineer
 J.R. McNeely – engineer
 Dan Shike – engineer
 F. Reid Shippen – engineer
 Billy Whittington – engineer
 Shane D. Wilson – engineer
 George Marino – mastering at Sterling Sound (New York City, New York)
 Jill Simonsen – package design
 Lisa Robinson – wardrobe stylist

References

2004 albums
Owsley (musician) albums